Paul Walter Fürst (25 April 1926 – 28 February 2013) was an Austrian musician and composer.

Furthermore, Fürst was solo violist with the Tonkünstler Orchestra (1952–1954), with the Munich Philharmonic (1954–1961) and from 1961 to 1990 he played in the Vienna State Opera Orchestra. From 1962, he also performed with the Vienna Philharmonic.

Life 
Fürst was born in Vienna, the son of the lawyer Rudolf Fürst and his wife Anna. In his childhood, he first learned the violin and piano, played in the children's orchestra and took part in various competitions.

Fürst attended the Musisches Gymnasium Frankfurt, where he completed his training in tuba, trombone, score playing and in rhythm and ear training. He also participated in the school choir. He made his first contacts with composing through the director of the grammar school, Kurt Thomas, who taught him the first compositional basics. His acquaintance with Hugo Distler and his works awakened in him the definite desire to compose.

Fürst returned to Vienna in 1945 and studied there a year later violin (Willi Boskovsky), piano (Hermann Schwermann), harmony (Joseph Marx) and improvisation at the University of Music and Performing Arts Vienna. At the same time, he had occasional lessons in composition with Alfred Uhl.

After successfully completing his studies in 1952, Fürst became principal violist with the Tonkünstler-Orchester Niederösterreich in the same year until 1954 and in the following years with the Munich Philharmonic (1954–1961) and the Vienna State Opera Orchestra (1961–1990). From 1969 to 1982 and from 1984 to 1990, he was managing director of the Vienna Philharmonic. Until his death, he held many offices, including president of the OESTIG and the AKM.

On the evening of 28 February 2013, Fürst died of cancer at the age of 86.

Major performances 
 Farbspiele op. 38
 Het Orgel is een belt
 Dorian Grey op. 35
 Orchesterstron IV
 Dorian`s Calling op. 39
 Seis Ventanas op. 83
 Sabado op. 22
 Violatüre op. 69
 Bavy – Concerto
 Catalina Homar

In addition, he received commissioned works for the Internationale Stiftung Mozarteum, the Wiener Festwochen, the Salzburg Festival and the Brucknerfest.

Awards and honors 
 1970: Conferment of the title of professor
 1970: Encouragement prize of the City of Vienna
 1980: Großes Decoration of Honour for Services to the Republic of Austria
 1982: 
 1990: Förderungspreis des Landes Niederösterreich
 1994: Musikpreis der Stadt Wien
 1996: Golden Ehrenzeichen der Stadt Gänserndorf
 2001: Golden 
 2005:  (Würdigungspreis).

Functions 
 1969–1982 and 1984–1990: Managing Director of the Vienna Philharmonic Orchestra
 from 1970: President and Managing Director of OESTIG
 from 1978: President of the Trade Union for Art, Media, Sport, Liberal Professions
 from 1984: Managing Director of LSG (Wahrnehmung von Leistungsschutzrechten GmbH, Vienna)
 from 1989: Vice-President of the International Music Union
 from 1998: President of AKM (State Authorised Society of Authors, Composers and Music Publishers)

References

External links 
 Musiker und Komponist Paul Walter Fürst gestorben
 Biogramm von Paul Walter Fürst
 Obituary Christian Heindl

20th-century Austrian composers
20th-century Austrian male musicians
Austrian classical violinists
Austrian classical violists
20th-century classical composers
Players of the Vienna Philharmonic
1926 births
2013 deaths
Musicians from Vienna